Panormos or Pyrgos (Πύργος) is a village and a former community on the island of Tinos, in the Cyclades, Greece. Since the 2011 local government reform it is part of the municipality Tinos, of which it is a municipal unit. The population was 489 at the 2011 census and the land area is 33.378 km². It is a small fishing village, located at the northwestern tip of the island. It shares the island of Tinos with the municipal units of Tinos (town) and Exomvourgo.

Notable people 
Yannoulis Chalepas (1851–1938), sculptor
Nikiforos Lytras (1832–1904), painter

References

Tinos
Villages in Greece